Daniel Docwras Murcutt (15 January 1817 — January 1853) was an English first-class cricketer.

The son of the cricketer Robert Murcutt, he was born at Cambridge in January 1817. Murcutt made his debut in first-class cricket for the Cambridge Town Club against Cambridge University at Parker's Piece in 1837. He played first-class cricket for the Town Club until 1842, making five appearances. Playing as a batsman, he scored 19 runs at a low average of 3.16 and with a highest score 13 not out. Murcutt died at Cambridge in January 1853.

References

External links

1817 births
1853 deaths
Sportspeople from Cambridge
English cricketers
Cambridge Town Club cricketers